Trine Pallesen (born 19 June 1969) is a Danish actress, best known for her work in Danish TV series Rejseholdet and Forbrydelsen.

Pallesen was born in Denmark, daughter of Per Pallesen and Kirsten Peüliche.

Filmography

Films
 Ballerup Boulevard (1986)
 Pakten (1995)
 A Corner of Paradise (1997)
 Little Big Girl (2002)
 Se dagens lys (TV movie, 2003)
 The Lost Treasure of the Knights Templar II (2007)
 The Pig (short, 2008)
 Sex, Drugs & Taxation (2013)
 Nøgle hus spejl (2015)

TV series
 Familien Krahne (1982)
 Sea Dragon (1990)
 Ugeavisen (1991)
 Strisser på Samsø (1997)
 Rejseholdet (2000-2004)
 2900 Happiness (2009)
 Forbrydelsen (2012)

References

External links
 

1969 births
Danish film actresses
Danish television actresses
Living people